Deewane is a 2000 Indian Hindi romantic action drama film that stars Ajay Devgn (in a double role), Urmila Matondkar and Mahima Chaudhary. After Bedardi and Kanoon, it was the third film Ajay and Urmila did together. The film flopped at the box office.

Plot
Vishal (Ajay Devgn), is a very hard-working officer who takes care of his family. He loves Sapna (Urmila Matondkar). His uncle, Lekhraj (Paresh Rawal), is trying to kill Vishal because he is a criminal whom Vishal is trying to unveil but does not know it is his uncle whom he respects. Then a robbery happens and Arun (Ajay Devgn) is the robber who is the duplicate of Vishal. Then Vishal was telling the Commissioner (Shivaji Satham), about Arun and him being his duplicate when he is shot by Lehkraj's son because he is on his father's side. Then Vishal goes into a coma and then the Commissioner makes a scheme with Arun to portray him as Vishal in the world's eyes so criminals have a fear of Vishal. When the Commissioner was talking with Arun, Sapna comes and the Commissioner tells Arun to hide behind the one-way transparent mirror. When Sapna comes, Arun instantly falls in love at first sight. When she was seeing through the mirror she did not see Arun but he saw her. Then the Commissioner tells Vishals family that Arun is Vishal. Arun's two friends, Pooja (Mahima Chaudhry) (who loves Arun but Arun does not love her back), and Okay (Johnny Lever). Pooja cries and adamantly asks the Commissioner to tell her the whereabouts of Arun. Time passes by and Vishal comes back from coma and Sapna is shocked and starts to hate Arun because of him not being Vishal and not telling her. Then as time passes, Arun keeps coming back because Vishal needs to be concentrating on his criminals and Sapna so he tells Arun to look after Sapna. One day Sapna tells Arun that "she spent time with Arun" thinking that whom she talking to is Vishal (but it is actually Arun she is talking to). She then starts to love Arun. Then Pooja finds out that Arun loves Sapna and Pooja is heartbroken. Sapna comes to Arun and asks him what should she do. He tells her that he does not deserve her but Vishal does. Vishal's and Sapna's marriage is arrange and the Commissioner finds out that the uncle of Vishal is the one who is terrorizing the city and Vishal is informed by him. Then the uncle shoots Arun trying to shoot Vishal. His uncle and his son are arrested and Arun survives. Just as he is leaving, he is stopped by Vishal and is told why is he leaving without Sapna. It is then revealed that when Pooja was telling Arun that Sapna loves Arun, she was actually talking to Vishal. Then Vishal unites Arun and Sapna. In the end, Vishal goes his own way, and so does Pooja telling that he will unites with Pooja.

Cast

Soundtrack
According to the Indian trade website Box Office India, with around 14,00,000 units sold, this film's soundtrack album was the year's thirteenth highest-selling. The track "Deewane" became the most popular one.

Box Office
The film was released on 11 August 2000 at budget of (₹9 cr)

On opening day collection was (₹0.70 cr) and first weekend collection was (₹2.09 cr). First week collection was (₹7 cr) and life time taking were (₹12 cr). India boxoffice nett gross collection was (₹6.95 cr) india boxoffice gross collection was (₹9.65 cr). Total netgross collection was (₹1,53,50,000) and film was considered as Flop at Box Office India.

Overseas

It was 30th-highest-grossing film of 2000.

References

External links
 
 

2000 films
2000 romantic drama films
2000s Hindi-language films
Indian romantic drama films
Films directed by Harry Baweja
Films distributed by Yash Raj Films